The Royal Saint-Hubert Galleries is an ensemble of three glazed shopping arcades in central Brussels, Belgium.

The galleries were designed and built by the architect Jean-Pierre Cluysenaar between 1846 and 1847, and precede other famous 19th-century European shopping arcades, such as the Galleria Vittorio Emanuele II in Milan and the Passage in Saint Petersburg. Like them, they have twin regular facades with distant origins in Vasari's long narrow street-like courtyard of the Uffizi in Florence, with glazed arched shopfronts separated by pilasters and two upper floors, all in an Italianate Cinquecento style, under an arched glass-paned roof with a delicate cast-iron framework. The complex was designated a historic monument in 1986.

The galleries are located in the block between the / and the / to the south and east, the / and the / to the north, and the / and the / to the west. This site is served by Brussels Central Station.

History
His idea, conceived in 1836, was finally authorised in February 1845. The partnership , in which the banker Jean-André Demot took an interest, was established by the summer of that year, but nine years were required to disentangle all the property rights, assembled by rights of eminent domain, during a process that caused one property owner to die of a stroke, and a barber, it was said, to slit his throat as the adjacent house came down.

Construction started on 6 May 1846, lasting for thirteen months, and the  passage was inaugurated on 20 June 1847 by King Leopold I and his two sons. In 1845, the Société named the three sections of the new passage the /, the / and the /.

Under its motto  ("Everything for everybody"), displayed in the fronton of its palace-like facade, the Saint-Hubert Galleries attracted people of fashion. Brilliantly lit, they offered the luxury of outdoor cafés in Brussels' inclement climate, in an ambiance of luxury retailers that brought to Brussels the true feel of a European capital. In the premises of La Chronique daily newspaper, on 1 March 1896, the first public showing of moving pictures took place of the cinematographers Lumière, fresh from their initial triumph in Paris.

A theatre inside the Galerie du Roi, the Royal Theatre of the Galleries, was designed by Cluysenaar and opened 7 June 1847. It became one of three royal theatres of Brussels, alongside the Royal Theatre of La Monnaie and the Royal Park Theatre, playing operetta and revues. Its interior was rebuilt in 1951. Another theatre, the Théâtre du Vaudeville, located in the Galerie de la Reine, was inaugurated in 1884 as the Casino Saint-Hubert.

The Royal Galleries were designated a historic monument on 19 November 1986. In 2008, they were submitted for World Heritage inscription and are included in UNESCO's "Tentative List" in the cultural heritage category. Nowadays, the King's Gallery is home to the Museum of Letters and Manuscripts, which honours the greatest men and women of art, history, music, the humanities and science.

Description
The main sections (King and Queen's Gallery) are separated by a peristyle at the point where the / crosses the gallery complex. At this point, there is a discontinuity in the straight perspective of the galleries. This "bend" was introduced purposefully in order to make the long perspective of the galleries, with its repetition of arches, pilasters and windows, less tedious.

 The Galerie du Roi stretches from the Rue des Bouchers to the /. It notably houses the Royal Theatre of the Galleries.
 The Galerie de la Reine, to the south, leads to the /, near the Grand-Place/Grote Markt (Brussels' main square), and on the other side of this street begins the Horta Gallery. Its best known shops are Delvaux leather goods and Neuhaus chocolatier.
 The Galerie des Princes is located perpendicularly between the Galerie du Roi and the /.

See also
 Arcade galleries in Brussels
 History of Brussels
 Belgium in "the long nineteenth century"

References

Notes

Bibliography

External links

 Galeries' official website
 Galeries Royales Saint-Hubert An account filled with detail.
 Galeries Royales Saint-Hubert Discovery guide with high quality pictures of the Royal Saint-Hubert Galleries.
 Panoramic photography virtual tour of the Royal Saint-Hubert Galleries

Shopping malls in Brussels
City of Brussels
Protected heritage sites in Brussels
Tourist attractions in Brussels
1847 establishments in Belgium
Arcades (architecture)
Commercial buildings completed in 1847